The 1993 Molson Indy Toronto was the ninth round of the 1993 CART World Series season, held on 18 July 1993 on the Exhibition Place, Toronto, Canada.

Results

Qualifying results

Starting grid

Race results

*C Chassis: L=Lola, P=Penske

*E Engine: C=Ilmor-Chevrolet, F=Cosworth-Ford

All cars utilized Goodyear tires.

Race statistics

Notes
 Time of race 1:53:58.00
Point Scoring System:
 Points are awarded based on each driver's resulting place (regardless of whether the car is running at the end of the race):

Bonus Points:
 1 For Pole Position
 1 For Leading The Most Laps of the Race

Championship standings after the race

Media

Television
The race was carried on same day tape delay flag-to-flag coverage in the United States on ABC Sports and live flag-to-flag coverage in Canada on CBC Sports.

Radio
The race was broadcast on radio by the IMS Radio Network.

References

External links
 Full Weekend Times & Results
 1993 Molson Indy Toronto

1993 Molson Indy Toronto
IndyCar
1993 Molson Indy Toronto